Silas G. Harris ( – August 1851) was the Speaker of the Michigan House of Representatives in 1850.

Concurrently to serving as the Speaker of the Michigan House of Representatives, he served as a member of the Michigan House of Representatives from the Kent and Ottawa County district from January 4, 1847 to 1850.  He died in Pine Plains, New York in 1851.

References 

1810s births
1851 deaths
Speakers of the Michigan House of Representatives
Democratic Party members of the Michigan House of Representatives
19th-century American politicians